The National Order of the Leopard was the highest honorific decoration of the Democratic Republic of the Congo from 1966 until 2002 when it was discontinued and replaced by the Order of the National Heroes Kabila-Lumumba. It was instituted on 24 May 1966 in the Ordinance-law Number 66-330 by President Joseph-Désiré Mobutu. It rewarded the high military or civil merits rendered in the Congo.

The President of the Congo was the Grand Chancellor of the Order. Its administration was in the care of the Chancellor.

Ranks 
The National Order of the Leopard was composed of five grades :
 Grand Cordon
 Grand Officer
 Commander
 Officer
 Knight

Notable recipients 

Grand Cordons
 Emperor Akihito
 Maria Barroso
 Jean-Bédel Bokassa
 Mohammad Reza Pahlavi
 Elizabeth II (1973)
 Prince Philip, Duke of Edinburgh  (1973)
 Juan Carlos I of Spain
 Isaac Kalonji
 Jules Fontaine Sambwa
 Haile Selassie
 Queen Sofía of Spain
 Kim Il-sung (1992)
 Kim Jong-il (1992)
Grand Officers
 Georges Forrest
 Paul Muhona
Commanders
 Fernand Kazadi Lupelekese
 Hugh Wontner
 Yosia Bulo Butso
Officers
 Peter Piot
 Robin Gillett
Knights

Unknown Classes
 Médard Autsai Asenga
 Jean Bolikango
 Robin Gillett
 Jean-Pierre Hallet
 Hosni Mubarak
 Ndaye Mulamba

References 

Leopard, National Order of the
Leopard, National Order of the
Awards established in 1966
Awards disestablished in 2002